Stalbridge is a small town and civil parish in Dorset, England, situated in the Blackmore Vale, near the border with Somerset. In the 2011 census the civil parish—which includes the hamlets of Stalbridge Weston, and Thornhill—had 1,160 households and a population of 2,698. It officially became a town in April 1992.

Though relatively small, Stalbridge has its own independent supermarket, dispensing pharmacy, dentist and optician, as well as many other services, reflecting its catchment area of surrounding farms and hamlets. It is also home to the local free newspaper, the Blackmore Vale Magazine.

History

There was a settlement near Stalbridge in Roman times. The town has a 15th-century church with a 19th-century tower, dedicated to Saint Mary and restored to designs by T. H. Wyatt, in 1878, which overlooks the town from a hill.  The town has had market rights since the time of King George I, though it has not held a regular market for many years.  In the town centre stands a 10-metre (30 ft) tall market cross, said to be the finest in the country.

Stalbridge was home to scientist Robert Boyle (see below), and writer Douglas Adams, who wrote much of The Hitchhiker's Guide to the Galaxy in the town. The town also boasts that it is home to the oldest living male twins in the world.

Artist Sir James Thornhill lived just south of the town, in Thornhill Park, which he bought in 1725. The house is believed to have been originally owned by Sir Walter Raleigh in the 16th century. In 1727, Sir James Thornhill erected an obelisk in the park to honour the accession of King George II.

From September 1863 Stalbridge was served by Stalbridge railway station on the Somerset and Dorset Joint Railway, with trains to Bath and Bournemouth.  During World War II a Ministry of Food depot was situated here.  The last train ran on 7 March 1966, and most of the tracks, station and goods yard have been replaced, though tracks still cross the road.

Stalbridge House 
In 1618 Mervyn Tuchet (or Audley), 2nd Earl of Castlehaven, who had inherited Stalbridge Park from his father, decided to build a mansion house on his Stalbridge estate.  He enclosed an area used as common land to the northwest of the church, moving tenant farmers out, and built a Jacobean style mansion, the fifth largest house in Dorset.

In 1631 the earl's eldest son James brought a case against him for "unnatural practices", and he was subsequently executed.

James sold the house to Richard Boyle, 1st Earl of Cork.  After his father's death, the scientist Robert Boyle became Lord of the Manor, and the house was his residence between 1644 and 1652.  It was here that he conducted many of his experiments.

At some point during the house's history a  stone wall was built around the boundary of Stalbridge Park. There is some argument as to when and why the wall was built. It may have been commissioned by Castlehaven as a status symbol, work for French prisoners of the Napoleonic Wars, or as work for local labourers in times of high unemployment.

By 1822 the house was in poor repair and the current owner, the Marquess of Anglesey, had it demolished. By 1827 all that remained was the raised area where it had stood.  The stone was sold off and much of it is in use elsewhere in the town, including the large farm house which now stands in the park.

There are many popular local myths and ghost stories about the demise of the house, mostly involving a fire destroying the house.

Stalbridge Park features in Thomas Hardy's Wessex as "Stapleford Park".

Governance
Stalbridge is the major part of Blackmore electoral ward. The ward also includes Stourton Caundle and south to the Lydlinch area. The ward population at the 2011 census was 3,574. Stalbridge is part of the North Dorset parliamentary constituency.

Demographics 
The town of Stalbridge had a population of 2,396 as of the 2011 census. There were 1,151 males and 1,210 females. The population includes 365 children under the age of 18, 1,167 people between the ages of 18 and 64, leaving 829 people aged 65 and over. The town is 98.5% white, with 0.7% of the population being Asian, and 0.3% Black. Religiously, the town is largely Christian, with Christians constituting 79.8% of the population. Another 19.4% are not religious, with 0.5% being Buddhist, corresponding to 11 people. There are also 2 Muslims and 1 Jew in the town, according to 2011 figures.

Geography

Stalbridge lies in the Blackmore Vale. As an area of hills, this means that the town lies largely on a gradient. The high street through the town centre follows the contour of the landscape, before climbing up Church Hill past the parish church of St. Mary, heading towards the Somerset border and Henstridge. To the east of the high street, Station Road heads down the hill, heading towards the Stalbridge trading estates, passing the modern housing estates built in the 1970s. To the West, the town climbs Barrow Hill, with older housing, some estates dating to the 1950s, and the 1990s Pond Walk.
There are two parks in Stalbridge, the larger of which is situated on Barrow hill, and hosts a football field and a cricket pitch, as well as two tennis courts. This park also has an outdoor playset. The smaller park functions largely as an outdoor playset, with two slides, a small football pitch and other toys.

There are several footpaths and bridleways in Stalbridge. A trailway follows the route of the disused Somerset and Dorset Joint Railway. It passes through the Stalbridge Nature Reserve, and has a hard pack surface suitable for cycles, including hybrid bicycles, or even endurance road bicycles.

Sports 
The town has a football club, a cricket club, and a tennis club.

Gallery

References

External links 

Stalbridge Info Community Website
Stalbridge Town Council official website
Stalbridge Genealogy site

 
Towns in Dorset
Civil parishes in Dorset
North Dorset District
Country houses in Dorset